Kračúnovce is a village and municipality in Svidník District in the Prešov Region of north-eastern Slovakia.

History
In historical records the village was first mentioned in 1347.

Geography
The municipality lies at an altitude of 198 metres and covers an area of 8.259 km2. It has a population of about 1179 people.

See also
 List of municipalities and towns in Slovakia

References

Genealogical resources

The records for genealogical research are available at the state archive "Statny Archiv in Presov, Slovakia"

 Roman Catholic church records (births/marriages/deaths): 1776-1897 (parish A)
 Greek Catholic church records (births/marriages/deaths): 1862-1933 (parish B)
 Lutheran church records (births/marriages/deaths): 1742-1897 (parish B)

External links
 
 
https://web.archive.org/web/20100202015957/http://www.statistics.sk/mosmis/eng/run.html
Surnames of living people in Kracunovce

Villages and municipalities in Svidník District
Šariš